Comtec may refer to:
Comtec Racing, a motor racing team based in the United Kingdom
Comtec, Japanese company which developed several games for MSX in 1984